The Hondo River was a settlement owned by the Kingdom of Great Britain since the early 18th century. In 1779, the Spanish repeatedly attacked the British settlements in British Honduras. The Hondo River was targeted, but the British were never driven out. However, they abandoned their colony until 1783.

References 
 Belize History

Conflicts in 1779
Hondo River (1779)
Hondo River (1779)